Cafius bistriatus is a species of relatively large rove beetles in the family Staphylinidae. It can be found from Quebec and Newfoundland to Florida but not yet in South Carolina or Georgia, and in Texas. East of Florida, it occupies Bermuda and the Bahamas. In the Caribbean, it occupies Antigua and Barbuda (Antigua), Barbados, Dominica, Dominican Republic, Grenada (Carriacou), Guadeloupe, Jamaica, Montserrat, Puerto Rico (including Mona), St. Kitts-Nevis (St. Kitts), St. Lucia, Trinidad & Tobago (both islands), and U.S. Virgin Islands (St. Thomas). It Has been found in the Venezuelan state Falcón. In eastern Mexico, it occurs in Veracruz, Campeche and Quintana Roo. On the Pacific coast, it can be found from California to the Mexican states of Baja California Norte, Baja California Sur, Guerrero, and Sonora. It can grow to be up to 7mm.

There are two known subspecies:

Cafius bistriatus bistriatus (Erichson, 1840).
Basionym Philonthus bistriatus Erichson, 1840. 
Synonym Philonthus bilineatus Erichson, 1840,
All of the specimens seen from Atlantic coasts, including the Gulf of Mexico and the Caribbean Sea belong to this, the typical subspecies.

Cafius bistriatus fulgens Frank, 1986. All of the specimens collected from Pacific coasts, including the Sea of Cortez of Mexico, and the inland Salton Sea of California belong to this subspecies.

References

Further reading

 NCBI Taxonomy Browser, Cafius bistriatus
 Ahn, K-J., and Frank, J.H. (2011). Cafius bistriatus (Coleoptera: Staphylinidae) distributional range extension to North Carolina. Florida Entomologist 94: 709–710. 
 Arnett, R.H. Jr., and M. C. Thomas (eds.). (2001). American Beetles, Volume I: Archostemata, Myxophaga, Adephaga, Polyphaga: Staphyliniformia.. CRC Press LLC, Boca Raton, FL.
 Arnett, Ross H. (2000). American Insects: A Handbook of the Insects of America North of Mexico. CRC Press.
 Blackwelder, R.E. (1943). Monograph of the West Inian beetles of the family Staphylinidae. U.S. Natn. Mus. Bull. 182: 1-vii, 1–658. 
 Frank, J.H., Carlysle T.C. and Rey, J.R.(1986). Biogeography of the seashore Staphylinidse Cafius bistriatus and C. rufifrons (Insecta: Coleoptera). Florida Scientist 49: 128–161.
 Navarrete-Heredia, J.L., Newton, A.F., Thayer, M.K., Ashe, J.S., Chandler, D.S. (2002) Guía ilustrada para los géneros de Staphylinidae (Coleoptera) de Měxico. Universidad de Guadalajara, Mexico. 
 Richard E. White. (1983). Peterson Field Guides: Beetles. Houghton Mifflin Company.

Staphylininae
Beetles described in 1840